Ganga Expressway is an under-construction, - long, 6-lane (expandable to 8) wide greenfield expressway in the state of Uttar Pradesh, India. It is being constructed in two phases. Phase-1 will connect Bijauli village on NH-334 in Meerut district with Judapur Dandu village on NH-19 in Allahabad district, while Phase-2 will see the extension of both sides of the expressway: from Allahabad to Ballia and from Meerut to Haridwar. The foundation stone of the expressway was laid by Prime Minister Narendra Modi on 18 December 2021, in Shahjahanpur. The expressway is expected to be completed by December 2024.

It is being implemented by the Uttar Pradesh Expressways Industrial Development Authority (UPEIDA) on the DFBOT Model and will be constructed and maintained by IRB Infrastructure and Adani Enterprises The Uttar Pradesh Cabinet, led by Yogi Adityanath met at Prayagraj, the venue of the Kumbh Mela and cleared the decks to construct Ganga Expressway on 29 January 2019.

Route
The 594 km long Ganga Expressway will connect Bijauli village near Kharkhauda on NH-334 in Meerut district with Judapur Dandu village near Soraon on NH-19 in Allahabad district. It will pass through 12 districts of Uttar Pradesh namely (from west to east), Meerut, Hapur, Bulandshahr, Amroha, Sambhal, Budaun, Shahjahanpur, Hardoi, Unnao, Raebareli, Pratapgarh and Prayagraj.

History
The Ganga Expressway project was initially launched in 2007 by the then Uttar Pradesh Chief Minister Mayawati. The project aims to construct a 1,047 km access-controlled 8-lane wide expressway running along the Ganga river. This expressway will connect Greater Noida to Ballia, ensuring high-speed connectivity between the Eastern and Western boundaries of Uttar Pradesh. The proposed expressway from Ballia to Greater Noida is also planned to serve as a flood control embankment since floods are a major cause of agricultural and environmental damage in the area, and lead to many deaths as well as the spread of diseases during India's monsoon season. The construction work on Ganga Expressway was not started then because of an order from the Allahabad High Court. The order instructed that the state and the concessionaire complete a full environmental study and obtain permission from the Government before embarking on the construction.

Construction

Phase-1
The UPEIDA has divided the construction work of 594 km long Phase-1 (Meerut to Prayagraj) into 12 different packages. The total expected project value is around ₹37,350 crores, including the land acquisition cost of around ₹9,500 crores.

On 30 November 2021, Adani Enterprises and IRB Infrastructure Developers emerged as the preferred bidders for the expressway’s development. Both were awarded the agreement to build and Operate the Expressway on DFBOT Basis with tolling rights for a period of 30 years. IRB Infrastructure bagged Group 1 (consisting of Packages 1, 2 & 3); while Adani bagged Groups 2, 3 & 4 (consisting of Packages 4 to 12) 

The list of contractors is as follows:

Note: The Adani Enterprises has further sub-contracted the civil construction work of Package-4, 5 and 6 to HG Infra Engineering Limited. Similarly it has sub-contracted Package-10, 11 and 12 to ITD Cementation India Limited.

Phase-2
The Government of Uttar Pradesh decided to extend the project on either ends i.e. Meerut to Haridwar (Spur-1) and Prayagraj to Ballia (Spur-2) via Varanasi. As of February 2021, a Detailed Project Report (DPR) for Phase-2 has not yet been prepared yet.

Status updates
 2007: Ganga Expressway initially launched by Mayawati as Greater Noida–Ballia Expressway.
 Jan 2019: Stalled planned project since 2007, Ganga Expressway project has revived again. The project was launched on 29 January 2019 by the Chief Minister of Uttar Pradesh, Yogi Adityanath.
 Feb 2019: Expressway to be built parallel to the Ganga river course, however, a distance of 10 km will be maintained so as to ensure easier compliance with environmental laws.
 Sep 2019: Two alignment plans ready, CM Yogi Adityanath to approve one of them and then a consultant will be appointed to prepare and submit the Detailed Project Report (DPR). Expressway to be ready by 2024.
 Feb 2020: ₹2,000 crores allocated for the construction of Ganga Expressway in the Uttar Pradesh budget on 18 February 2020. The 594 km long 1st phase connecting Meerut to Prayagraj is set to be completed by 2024.
 Mar 2021: Tenders floated for Phase-1 by the government of Uttar Pradesh in 12 packages.
 May 2021: 3,440 hectares of required land has been acquired till 30 May. The 594 km long 1st phase of Ganga Expressway will pass through 519 villages across 12 districts.
 Jun 2021: 5,260 hectares of required land has been acquired till 30 June.
 Aug 2021: 6,532 hectares (around 90%) of required land has been acquired till 16 August. Punjab National Bank (PNB) approved ₹5,100 crore loan for this project on 21 August.
 Sep 2021: Around 93% of land acquisition completed. The Uttar Pradesh cabinet gave approval to this project on 2 September.
Nov 2021: The expressway gets environmental clearance from Ministry of Environment, Forest and Climate Change, and Uttar Pradesh Cabinet gives ₹36,230 crore clearance to build the expressway. Foundation stone for the start of construction work will be laid in December, and 94% land acquisition is completed, as of 20 November.
Nov 2021: 3 firms bid to build the expressway. Bidder name will likely be finalised by this week or next week, as of 22 November.
Dec 2021: Adani Enterprises and IRB Infrastructure win the expressway’s construction work. Prime Minister Narendra Modi laid the foundation stone for the expressway on 18 December 2021.
Apr 2022: Construction work started by Adani Enterprises in Binawar (Budaun) on 11 April.
Jul 2022: 56% of clearing and grubbing work is complete.
Jan 2023: 84% of clearing and grubbing, 10.25% of earthwork is complete.
Mar 2023: The expressway is now expected to be completed by December 2024.

See also
Expressways in India
Yamuna Expressway
Purvanchal Expressway
Loknayak Ganga Path
Agra–Lucknow Expressway
Bundelkhand Expressway

References

Proposed expressways in India
Expressways in Uttar Pradesh
Transport in Allahabad district
Transport in Meerut
Proposed infrastructure in Uttar Pradesh